National Highway 227 (NH 227) is a  National Highway in India.

References

National highways in India
National Highways in Bihar